The Billboard Hot Latin Tracks is a chart that ranks the best-performing Latin singles of the United States. Published by Billboard magazine, based collectively on each single's airplay. There were a total of 18 number-one Latin singles in 2009, although 19 claimed the top spot as Luis Fonsi's "No Me Doy Por Vencido" reached its peak position in 2008, and thus is excluded.

In 2009, six acts achieved their first U.S. number-one single either as a lead artist or a featured guest: Tito El "Bambino", Makano, Aleks Syntek, Noel Schajris, and Espinoza Paz. Nelly Furtado earned her first number-one Latin single as a solo artist in Spanish with "Manos Al Aire" from her first Spanish language album "Mi Plan". Luis Fonsi and Banda El Recodo each earned two number-one singles, while duo Wisin & Yandel earned 3 number-one singles.

Chart history

See also
Top Latin Songs

References

United States Latin Songs
2009
2009 in Latin music